Lynda Lee Kaid (August22, 1948April13, 2011) was a Professor of Telecommunication and Research Foundation Professor in the College of Journalism & Communications at the University of Florida and named by Communication Quarterly as one of the most productive scholars in the communication discipline. She authored more than 30 books and more than 200 peer reviewed articles and chapters on political communication and political advertising.

Kaid was honored as a Distinguished Alumni in 2007 from Southern Illinois University. She earned a doctorate and master's degree in speech communication and a bachelor's degree in German from SIU.

She was a three-time Fulbright Scholar. Dr. Kaid was a University of Florida Research Foundation Professor.

The National Communication Association's Political Communication Division established the annual Lynda Lee Kaid Outstanding Dissertation in Political Communication award. The International Communication Association's Political Communication Division established the Keith R. Sanders and Lynda Lee Kaid Best Political Communication Article of the Year Award.

Selected bibliography 

Kaid, L. L. & Wadsworth, A. J. Political Campaign Communication: A Bibliography and Guide to the Literature 1973-1982. (Scarecrow Press, 1985).
Sanders, K. R., Kaid, L. L., & Nimmo, D. Political Communication Yearbook, 1984. (Southern Illinois University Press, 1985).
Kaid, L. L., Nimmo, D., & Sanders, K. R.  (Eds.), New Perspectives on Political Advertising. (Southern Illinois University Press, 1986).
Kaid, L. L. & Holtz-Bacha, C. (Eds.),  Political Advertising in Western Democracies: Parties and Candidates on Television. (Sage Publications, 1995).
Ragan, S., Bystrom, D. G., Kaid, L. L., & Beck, C.  (Eds.), The Lynching of Language: Gender, Politics, and Power in the Hill-Thomas Hearings. (University of Illinois Press, 1996).
Kaid, L. L. & Bystrom, D. (Eds.), The Electronic Election: Perspectives on the 1996 Campaign Communication. (Routledge, 1998).
Johnston, A. & Kaid, L. L.  Communicating Politics: Engaging the Public in Democratic Life. (Praeger, 2000).
Kaid, L. L., McKinney, M. S., & Tedesco, J. C. (Eds.). Civic Dialogue in the 1996 Presidential Campaign: Candidate, Media, and Public Voices. (Hampton Press, 2001).
Kaid, L. L., Tedesco, J. C., Bystrom, D. G., McKinney, M. S. (Eds.). The Millennium Election: Communication in the 2000 Campaign. (Rowman & Littlefield, 2003).
Kaid, L. L. (Ed.), Handbook of Political Communication Research. (Routledge, 2004).
McKinney, M. S.,  Kaid, L. L., Bystrom, D. G., & Carlin, D. B. (Eds.), Communicating Politics: Engaging the Public in Democratic Life. (Peter Lang, 2005).
Kaid, L. L. &  Holtz-Bacha, C. (Eds.),  The SAGE Handbook of Political Advertising. (Sage Publications, 2006).
Kaid, L. L. &  Holtz-Bacha, C. (Eds.), Encyclopedia of Political Communication. (Sage Publications, 2007).
Kaid, L. L. (Ed.), The EU Expansion: Communicating Shared Sovereignty in the Parliamentary Elections. (Peter Lang, 2007).
Strömbäck, J. & Kaid, L. L. (Eds.), The Handbook of Election News Coverage Around the World. (Routledge, 2009).
Oates, S., Kaid, L. L., & Berry, M. Terrorism, Elections, and Democracy: Political Campaigns in the United States, Great Britain, and Russia. (Palgrave Macmillan, 2010).
Kaid, L. L. (Ed.), Television and Politics in Evolving European Democracies. (Nova Science Publishers, 2011).
Hendricks, J. A. & Kaid, L. L. (Eds.), Techno Politics in Presidential Campaigning: New Voices, New Technologies and New Voters. (Routledge, 2011).

References

External links 
  UF Research Foundation Professor, Lynda Lee Kaid

Kaid, Lynda Lee
Kaid, Lynda Lee
American mass media scholars
American political writers
University of Florida faculty
University of Oklahoma faculty
Southern Illinois University alumni
American women non-fiction writers
American women academics
21st-century American women